The 2016 AFC Cup knockout stage was played from 24 May to 5 November 2016. A total of 16 teams competed in the knockout stage to decide the champions of the 2016 AFC Cup.

Qualified teams
The winners and runners-up of each of the eight groups in the group stage qualified for the knockout stage. Both West Zone and East Zone had eight qualified teams.

Format

In the knockout stage, the 16 teams played a single-elimination tournament, with the teams split between the two zones until the final. In the quarter-finals and semi-finals, each tie was played on a home-and-away two-legged basis, while in the round of 16 and final, each tie was played as a single match. The away goals rule (for two-legged ties), extra time (away goals would not apply in extra time) and penalty shoot-out were used to decide the winner if necessary (Regulations Article 12.4).

Starting from this season, the knockout stage was split between the two zones until the final, similar to the AFC Champions League (Regulations Article 12.3).

Schedule
The schedule of each round was as follows.

Bracket
The bracket of the knockout stage was determined as follows:
Round of 16: (group winners host match)

West Zone
Winner Group A vs. Runner-up Group C
Winner Group C vs. Runner-up Group A
Winner Group B vs. Runner-up Group D
Winner Group D vs. Runner-up Group B
East Zone
Winner Group E vs. Runner-up Group G
Winner Group G vs. Runner-up Group E
Winner Group F vs. Runner-up Group H
Winner Group H vs. Runner-up Group F

Quarterfinals: (matchups and order of legs decided by draw)

West Zone
QF1
QF2
East Zone
QF3
QF4

Semifinals: (Winners QF1 and QF3 host first leg, Winners QF2 and QF4 host second leg)

West Zone
SF1: Winner QF1 vs. Winner QF2
East Zone
SF2: Winner QF3 vs. Winner QF4

Final: Winner SF1 vs. Winner SF2 (host team decided by draw)

Round of 16

In the round of 16, the winners of one group played the runners-up of another group from the same zone, with the group winners hosting the match.

|-
!colspan=3|West Zone

|-
!colspan=3|East Zone

|}

West Zone

East Zone

Quarter-finals

In the quarter-finals, the four teams from the West Zone were drawn into two ties, and the four teams from the East Zone were drawn into the other two ties, with the order of legs also decided by the draw.

The draw for the quarter-finals was held on 9 June 2016, 15:00 MYT (UTC+8), at the Petaling Jaya Hilton Hotel in Kuala Lumpur, Malaysia. There was no seeding or country protection, so teams from the same association could be drawn into the same tie.

|-
!colspan=5|West Zone

|-
!colspan=5|East Zone

|}

West Zone

Al-Quwa Al-Jawiya won 5–1 on aggregate.

Al-Ahed won 3–0 on aggregate.

East Zone

Johor Darul Ta'zim won 3–2 on aggregate.

Bengaluru FC won 1–0 on aggregate.

Semi-finals

In the semi-finals, the two quarter-final winners from the West Zone played each other, and the two quarter-final winners from the East Zone played each other, with the order of legs determined by the quarter-final draw.

|-
!colspan=5|West Zone

|-
!colspan=5|East Zone

|}

West Zone

Al-Quwa Al-Jawiya won 4–3 on aggregate.

East Zone

Bengaluru FC won 4–2 on aggregate.

Final

In the final, the two semi-final winners played each other, with the host team decided by a draw, held after the quarter-final draw.|}

Notes

References

External links
AFC Cup, the-AFC.com

3